Muralplast is a range of sustainable coatings and protective treatments applied by British specialist painting contractor Lucas.

History 
Muralplast was first launched in the 1960s and became known  as a coatings product for exterior and interior protection and decoration. Lucas extended the range of products and re-launched the brand in July 2010.

Products 
There are four main product ranges. 

 M-Guard is designed to provide extra protection from the weather, pollution and vandalism.

 MSP or Multi Surface Paint is designed to provide a consistent finish across a range of internal and external surfaces.

 ArmourColor provides decorative wall finishes incorporating high safety and environmental standards.

 M-Tred floor resins are durable floor finishes, formulated for buildings that are required to meet high health and safety standards or other special regulations.

References

External links 
 Official Website
 S. Lucas (Parent company)
 ArmourColor Surface Finishes

Paint and coatings companies of the United Kingdom
British brands